is a kaiju who first appeared in Toho's 1973 film Godzilla vs. Megalon, his only film appearance to date.

Overview
Megalon is a bipedal, humanoid, burrowing insect resembling a beetle, standing 55 meters (180 feet) tall and weighing 40,000 metric tons (44,092 short tons), and the god of the subterranean nation of Seatopia. While Megalon possesses limited intelligence (he must be led to his destination by the protagonists' robot, Jet Jaguar), he makes up for it with his strength. Megalon has two drill-like front appendages, which it uses both for burrowing and as weapons, and a set of wings usually covered by a beetle-like shell. The creature can fly, burrow, and swim at high speeds. Unlike most kaiju under fire from humans who prevail with brute force, Megalon uses retreat and ambush tactics to defeat human forces in his first encounter. Megalon also has a horn (similar to a rhinoceros beetle) from which it can fire lightning-like bolts of electricity and it is capable of spitting napalm-like fire bombs from its mouth. 

In Godzilla vs. Megalon, Megalon is worshipped as a deity by the people of the subterranean kingdom known as Seatopia. The Seatopians unleash Megalon on the surface world as revenge for the damage caused to Seatopia through reckless nuclear testing. During his assault on the surface world, Megalon comes into conflict with Godzilla and Jet Jaguar.

Megalon returns in Godzilla: Monster Apocalypse, a prequel novel to Godzilla: Planet of the Monsters. Megalon appeared on the West coast of Africa in 2012 and crossed the continent, destroying countless nations, and disappeared into the Indian Ocean. There were 20 million casualties, including the wounded. Shortly after Megalon's attack across Africa, millions of refugees fled to Europe and the Middle East due to civil wars across the continent, this also lead to a dispute between refugees and locals in Egypt that lead to a second civil war. Megalon returned 10 years later and attacked South Africa, forcing humanity to abandon the continent.

In Godzilla: Project Mechagodzilla, a prequel novel to Godzilla: City on the Edge of Battle, 7 years later, Megalon moves to Asia. It annihilates India and Pakistan, both of whom just recovered from a nuclear war against each other. After destroying the Philippines, Megalon moved to the Okinawa, but were intercepted by King Caesar, a guardian deity of the island, both monsters died in the battle.

Appearances

Films
 Godzilla vs. Megalon (1973)

Television
 Godzilla Island (1997-1998)

Video games
 Godzilla Trading Battle (PlayStation, 1998)
 Godzilla: Destroy All Monsters Melee (GameCube, Xbox, 2002 - 2003)
 Godzilla: Domination! (GBA, 2002)
 Godzilla: Save the Earth (Xbox, PS2, 2004)
 Godzilla: Unleashed (Wii, 2007)
 Godzilla Unleashed: Double Smash (Nintendo DS, 2007)
 Godzilla: Unleashed (PS2, 2007)
 Godzilla Defense Force (2019)
 Kaiju Universe (Roblox, 2019-2022)

Literature

 Godzilla at World’s End (1998)
 Godzilla: The Half-Century War (comic, 2012-2013)
 Godzilla: Rulers of Earth (comic, 2013-2015)
 Godzilla: Monster Apocalypse (2017)
 Godzilla: Project Mechagodzilla (2018)

References

Fictional beetles
Fictional insects
Fictional gods
Film characters introduced in 1973
Godzilla characters
Kaiju
Fictional monsters
Science fiction film characters
Toho monsters
Horror film villains